The 2005 McNeese State Cowboys football team was an American football team that represented McNeese State University as a member of the Southland Conference (Southland) during the 2005 NCAA Division I-AA football season. In their sixth year under head coach Tommy Tate, the team compiled an overall record of 5–4, with a mark of 3–3 in conference play, and finished tied for third in the Southland.

Schedule

Notes

References

McNeese State
McNeese Cowboys football seasons
McNeese State Cowyboys football